The Ambassador to Bern is a 2014 Hungarian television film directed by Attila Szász.

References

External links 

2014 drama films
Hungarian television films